Valle de San Juan is a municipality in the Tolima department of Colombia.  The population of the municipality was 6,178 as of 2008.

References 

Municipalities of Tolima Department